Nematabramis verecundus is a species of cyprinid found in the Titunod River on Mindanao in the Philippines. It belongs to the genus Nematabramis and is treated as synonym of Nematabramis alestes by some authorities.

References

Fish described in 1924
Danios
Nematabramis
Fish of the Philippines